The Lockington Covered Bridge was a historic covered bridge that once spanned the Great Miami River near Lockington, Ohio, United States. Built in 1848, it employed the Long Truss method of construction. Construction elements included vertical wooden siding, wooden structural elements, wooden shingles on its roof, and cut stone abutments.

At the time of its construction, the Lockington bridge was part of a prosperous area whose economy was driven by traffic on the Miami and Erie Canal.  Although the area's economy has declined since that time, some historic elements remain, and the covered bridge remained a major component of the area's historic nature long after the closure of the canal.  By the 1970s, it had become one of the county's oldest extant bridges: it was the only covered bridge in its original location, and it was one of only eight Long Truss covered bridges throughout Ohio.  In recognition of its engineering significance, the bridge was listed on the National Register of Historic Places in 1975.

 
By the tenth anniversary of its designation as a historic site, the bridge had deteriorated significantly.  As wear had damaged the abutments, and as the floor had partially rotted, the Shelby County Engineer's Office closed the bridge in 1985.  Four years later, the bridge was destroyed by an unexpected fire.  Until that point, the county had been seeking to create a park surrounding the bridge; these plans were quickly cancelled.  Despite its destruction more than thirty years ago, the Lockington Covered Bridge remains on the National Register.

References

1989 fires in the United States
Covered bridges on the National Register of Historic Places in Ohio
Former road bridges in the United States
Buildings and structures in Shelby County, Ohio
National Register of Historic Places in Shelby County, Ohio
Long truss bridges in the United States
Bridges completed in 1848
Road bridges on the National Register of Historic Places in Ohio
Wooden bridges in Ohio
1848 establishments in Ohio
1989 disestablishments in Ohio
Fires in Ohio